Foodland may refer to:

Supermarket chains
FoodLand, eastern U.S.
Foodland (Canada)
Foodland (South Australia)
Foodland (Thailand)
Foodland Hawaii

Others
Foodland (film), a Canadian film
Foodland Ontario, a consumer food promotion program